General Sir Torquhil George Matheson, 5th Baronet, KCB, CMG (4 February 1871 − 13 November 1963) was a Scottish officer who commanded three different divisions of the British Army in some of the heaviest fighting of the First World War. He had previously served in the militia and with the Coldstream Guards in the Second Boer War. For his service, he was knighted in 1921 and in 1944 he inherited the Matheson baronetcy from his brother Roderick.

Early life and family
Torquhil Matheson was born in February 1871, the youngest child of Sir Alexander Matheson, 1st Baronet, and was educated at Eton College. He inherited the baronetcy in 1944 when his four older brothers (including the 2nd, 3rd and 4th Baronets) predeceased him and three nephews (the 3rd Bt.'s only sons) were all killed in action in World War I.

In 1900 he married Ella Louisa Linton and they divorced in 1923 (no children). He then married Lady Elizabeth Keppel, the youngest child of Arnold Keppel, 8th Earl of Albemarle. They had two sons: 
Major Sir Torquhil Alexander Matheson of Matheson, 6th Bt. (15 Aug 1925–9 Apr 1993)
Major Sir Fergus John Matheson of Matheson, 7th Bt. (22 Feb 1927–2017)

Military career
Matheson joined the Hertfordshire Militia before being commissioned as a second lieutenant into the Bedfordshire Regiment on 15 December 1888. On 2 June 1894, Matheson transferred from the Bedfordshires, in which he was then a lieutenant, to the Coldstream Guards as a second lieutenant again, and was promoted lieutenant in that regiment on 1 December 1897. He served in the Second Boer War, as adjutant of the 1st Battalion from 1899 until May 1902. The battalion took part in the battles of Belmont (23 November 1899), Enslin, Modder River (28 November 1899) and Magersfontein (11 December 1899), and he was mentioned in despatches, and promoted to captain on 20 April 1901. Following the end of the war in June 1902, Matheson left Cape Town in the SS Carisbrook Castle in September 1902, arriving at Southampton early the following month.

He was appointed Regimental Adjutant to the Coldstream Guards on 1 January 1903.

At the outbreak of the First World War in August 1914, Matheson went with his regiment to France and fought in several actions, being promoted to lieutenant colonel in 1915 and taking command of the 3rd Battalion.

In July 1915, Matheson advanced to command the 46th Brigade, part of the 15th (Scottish) Division, and remained in this position until March 1917, when he was promoted to major-general and took over the 20th (Light) Division. In August, shortly before the division was due to deploy in the Battle of Passchendaele, Matheson was severely affected by a German gas barrage that struck his headquarters, forcing him to relinquish control of the division. In September he took over the 4th Division, remaining in this position until September 1918, when he was replaced by Louis Lipsett and took charge of the Guards Division, which he led for the final months of the war until the armistice with Germany in November 1918, which ended hostilities.

In 1918, Matheson was made a Companion of the Order of the Bath and the following year was awarded the Croix de Guerre and appointed a Companion of the Order of St Michael and St George on relinquishing command of the Guards Division. In 1922, he was advanced to Knight Commander of the Order of the Bath "for valuable services rendered in the Field with the Waziristan Force" and commanded the 7th Guards Brigade and then the 7th Infantry Division. He then became General Officer Commanding (GOC) of the 54th (East Anglian) Division in February 1927.

On 30 June 1931, he was appointed to his last command, as General Officer Commanding-in-Chief (GOC-in-C) Western Command, India, and on 30 June 1935 retired from that post as a full General. On 2 July 1935 he was gazetted to the Retired List, and in 1944 succeeded to his grandfather's baronetcy on the death of his elder brother Roderick. He himself died in November 1963, at the age of 92.

References

Bibliography
 

|-

|-

|-

|-
 

|-

1871 births
1963 deaths
British Army generals
Baronets in the Baronetage of the United Kingdom
Bedfordshire and Hertfordshire Regiment officers
British Army generals of World War I
British Army personnel of the Second Boer War
Coldstream Guards officers
Companions of the Order of St Michael and St George
Knights Commander of the Order of the Bath
People educated at Eton College
Military personnel from London